Pentre Bont is a small village in the Dolwyddelan community, in the historic county of Caernarfonshire and county borough of Conwy.

References

See also
List of localities in Wales by population

Villages in Conwy County Borough